George Hitchcock (September 29, 1850 – August 2, 1913) was an American painter, born in Providence, Rhode Island, and was mostly active in Europe, notably in the Netherlands.

Biography
Hitchcock graduated from Brown University, and from Harvard Law School in 1874. He then turned his attention to art and became a pupil of Gustave Boulanger and Jules-Joseph Lefebvre at the Académie Julian in Paris.

He attracted notice in the Paris Salon of 1885 with his Tulip Growing, of a Dutch garden he painted in the Netherlands. For years he had a studio near Egmond aan Zee, Netherlands, where he started his "Art Summer School" that later resulted in a group of returning summer artists that informally became the Egmondse School (1890-1905). He received these students and guests at his "Huis Schuylenburgh", a large estate in Egmond aan den Hoef.

He became a chevalier of the French Legion of Honour and a member of the Vienna Academy of Arts, the Munich Secession Society, and other art bodies, and is represented in the Dresden gallery, the imperial collection in Vienna, the Chicago Art Institute, and the Detroit Institute of Arts. In 1909 he was elected to the National Academy of Design as an Associate Academician.

Hitchcock married Henrietta Walker Richardson on July 6, 1881. He divorced her on July 31, 1905, and nine days later married Cecil Jay, a student at the Art Summer School who was thirty-three years his junior. The newlyweds moved to Paris, effectively ending the summer school. 

At the time of his death, he was living in a houseboat in the harbor of Marken, Netherlands.

Selected paintings

References

External links

 George Hitchcock at Artcyclopedia
George Hitchcock exhibition catalogs

1850 births
1913 deaths
Harvard Law School alumni
19th-century American painters
American male painters
20th-century American painters
Académie Julian alumni
National Academy of Design associates
Chevaliers of the Légion d'honneur
Brown University alumni
19th-century American male artists
20th-century American male artists